Nueva Paz is a municipality and town in the Mayabeque Province of Cuba.
It was founded in 1802.

Geography
The municipality is divided into 8 consejos populares (i.e. "people's councils): the town of Nueva Paz and the villages of Bagáez, Jagua, Navarra, Palos, San Luis, Las Vegas and Yaya.

Demographics
In 2004, the municipality of Nueva Paz had a population of 24,277.

Transport
Nueva Paz is served by the A1 motorway, the Autopista Nacional, linking Havana to Santa Clara and Sancti Spíritus. The villages of Vegas and Palos are served by a line of the Havana Suburban Railway.

See also
Nueva Paz Municipal Museum
Municipalities of Cuba
List of cities in Cuba

References

External links

Populated places in Mayabeque Province